Leonel Romero (born 28 January 1987) is a Peruvian–Swiss football defender, currently playing for Swiss club Young Fellows Juventus.

Career
He spent the entire 2007–08 season on loan at FC Wohlen. He signed new contract in 2009.

External links
football.ch profile

Swiss men's footballers
Grasshopper Club Zürich players
FC Wohlen players
Swiss Super League players
1987 births
Living people
SC Young Fellows Juventus players
Swiss people of Peruvian descent
People with acquired Swiss citizenship
Association football defenders